The 2019 Burnie International was a professional tennis tournament played on hard courts. It was the sixteenth (men) and tenth (women) editions of the tournament which was part of the 2019 ATP Challenger Tour and the 2019 ITF Women's World Tennis Tour. It took place in Burnie, Australia between 21 and 27 January 2019.

Men's singles main-draw entrants

Seeds

 1 Rankings are as of 14 January 2019.

Other entrants
The following players received wildcards into the singles main draw:
  Harry Bourchier
  Jacob Grills
  Christopher O'Connell
  Luke Saville
  Aleksandar Vukic

The following player received entry into the singles main draw using a protected ranking:
  Daniel Altmaier

The following players received entry into the singles main draw as alternates:
  Alessandro Bega
  Andrew Harris
  Harri Heliövaara
  Dayne Kelly
  Bradley Mousley

The following players received entry into the singles main draw using their ITF World Tennis Ranking:
  Steven Diez
  David Pérez Sanz
  Jordi Samper Montaña
  Alexander Zhurbin

The following players received entry from the qualifying draw:
  Jeremy Beale
  Sadio Doumbia

Women's singles main-draw entrants

Seeds

 1 Rankings are as of 14 January 2019.

Other entrants
The following players received wildcards into the singles main draw:
  Destanee Aiava
  Naiktha Bains
  Lizette Cabrera
  Zoe Hives

The following players received entry from the qualifying draw:
  Alison Bai
  Chang Kai-chen
  Gabriella Da Silva-Fick
  Jennifer Elie
  Nadia Podoroska
  Belinda Woolcock

Champions

Men's singles

 Steven Diez def.  Maverick Banes, 7–5, 6–1

Women's singles

 Belinda Woolcock def.  Paula Badosa Gibert, 7–6(7–3), 7–6(7–4)

Men's doubles

 Lloyd Harris /  Dudi Sela def.  Mirza Bašić /  Tomislav Brkić 6–3, 6–7(3–7), [10–8].

Women's doubles

 Ellen Perez /  Arina Rodionova def.  Irina Khromacheva /  Maryna Zanevska, 6–4, 6–3

References

External links
 2019 Burnie International at ITFtennis.com
 Official website

2019 ATP Challenger Tour
2019 ITF Women's World Tennis Tour
2019 in Australian tennis
January 2019 sports events in Australia